James Farrell is a British television executive, currently working as executive producer on HBO's prequel to Game of Thrones.

Career
Farrell was previously head of development at BBC Studios. He was named a Broadcast magazine Hot Shot in 2014 and his shows have won at the BAFTAs, IFTAs and National Television Awards.

This Is Going to Hurt
Farrell later served as an executive producer for the BBC medical comedy drama series This Is Going to Hurt, an adaptation of Adam Kay's memoir of the same name.

Personal life
Farrell is married to writer and comedian Adam Kay.

References

Living people
British television producers
Year of birth missing (living people)
British LGBT businesspeople
LGBT television producers